Calvert County Public Schools is a public school district serving all of Calvert County, Maryland. The district is governed by a six-person Board of Education, five of which are elected by the public in non-partisan elections, and a student elected by the Calvert Association of Student Councils. The school district currently has 4 high schools, 6 middle schools, and 13 elementary schools.

High schools
Calvert, Prince Frederick, Maryland
Huntingtown, Huntingtown, Maryland
Northern, Chaneyville, Maryland
Patuxent, Lusby, Maryland

Middle schools
Calvert, Prince Frederick, Maryland
Mill Creek, Lusby, Maryland
Northern, Chaneyville, Maryland
Plum Point, Huntingtown, Maryland
Southern, Lusby, Maryland
Windy Hill, Owings, Maryland

Elementary school
Appeal, Lusby, Maryland
Beach, Chesapeake Beach, Maryland
Barstow, Barstow, Maryland
Calvert, Prince Frederick, Maryland
Dowell, near Solomons, Maryland
Huntingtown, Huntingtown, Maryland
Mt. Harmony, Owings, Maryland
Mutual, Port Republic, Maryland
Patuxent, Lusby, Maryland
Plum Point, Huntingtown, Maryland
St. Leonard, St. Leonard, Maryland
Sunderland, Sunderland, Maryland
Windy Hill, Owings, Maryland

Other institutions

Other institutions under the Calvert County Public School district include Calvert Country School, a special education school, and the Career & Technology Academy (formally known as the Calvert Career Center), a vocational education center.

Future schools

The district's twelfth elementary school, Barstow Elementary School in Barstow opened in late 2008. Additionally, Northern High School in Owings, is currently under a reconstruction, which is subject to start in the Spring of 2016 and estimated to be finished by the beginning of the SY18-19.

External links

School districts in Maryland
Education in Calvert County, Maryland